Agostino Bonello (born 11 August 1949, Valletta,  Malta), also known as Ino Bonello, is a production designer, art director and film producer.

Career
Bonello's career started out at a very young age as a television presenter of children's programs. Amongst others, he presented such programs as Minn Fomm It Tfal, Werqa, Mass Sittax and Tbissima. He produced and presented an array of arts and crafts related television programs on TVM (Television Malta).

Next he worked as an architectural draughtsman and detailer. This work led to an assignment at Brega in Libya working for Esso and Homles and Narver Inc., Engineers and Constructors.

After that he started work at Mediterranean Film Studios. Bonello occupied various posts, including Production Manager, Manager of Operations, and Chief Executive.

While working at Mediterranean Film Studios, he was in charge of the refurbishment and upgrading of the studios. He was also responsible for marketing and formed part of the team negotiating with foreign companies in acquiring projects such as Cutthroat Island, White Squall, Skipper and several other films, including various productions of commercials such as Pasta Agnesi, Repsol Oil, Zurich Insurance, Russian Vodka, Borsh, Citroën, Renault 19 and others.

Awards
In late 2003, Bonello received a nomination for his work in the art department by the Art Directors Guild for the TV miniseries Helen of Troy.

Notable works
Howards' Way - 1989 - Location manager
Der Skipper - 1990 - Location manager
Cutthroat Island - 1995
Julius Caesar (TV miniseries) - 2002 
Helen of Troy (TV miniseries) - 2003 - Art director (Achieved nomination by the ADG)
She's Gone - 2004 - Art director
Clarion's Call - 2004 - Production designer
A Previous Engagement - 2005 - Art director
Munich - 2005 - Art director
What We Did on our Holiday - 2006 - Art director
The Roman Mysteries - 2007 - Art director
Eichmann - 2007 - Art director
Man of East - 2008

External links
 Filming-Malta.com
 

1949 births
Living people
Maltese art directors
Maltese television presenters
People from Valletta